Greg Kramer (11 March 1961 – 8 April 2013) was a British-Canadian author, actor, director, and magician. Born and raised in Hertfordshire, England, he emigrated to Canada in 1981 and spent the remainder of his life living in Vancouver, Toronto and Montreal.

Early life
Kramer was born in Hertfordshire, England on 11 March 1961.

Career
His first novel, The Pursemonger of fugu, published by Riverbank Press in 1995, was shortlisted for the City of Toronto Book Award. His other novels included Couchwarmer (1997) and Wally (2004). His short story collection Hogtown Bonbons (1999) was originally published by Xtra! in Toronto as a regular column. He also wrote several theatrical plays.

As an actor, he appeared regularly on the television series Forever Knight, John Woo's Once a Thief and Tales from the Neverending Story, and as a voice actor in Tripping the Rift, George and Martha and Arthur. He also had supporting roles in numerous films, including 300, The Day After Tomorrow, I'm Not There and On the Road. In theatres he worked across Canada, from the Vancouver Playhouse to the National Arts Centre in Ottawa.

Directing credits include Tiger's Heart at the Centaur Theatre, Marat/Sade (Dora nomination, best production), and Cat on a Hot Tin Roof at the Segal Centre for Performing Arts in Montreal, which garnered him a Best Director MECCA award. Also a magician, Kramer was the magic consultant and coach for Des McAnuff's production of The Tempest at the Stratford Shakespeare Festival, featuring Christopher Plummer. As a playwright, his credits included Lies of the Vampyre, Skateboard Tango, and Isadora Fabulist! written for Imago Theatre, as well as Queens and the Great Out Doors.

Personal life and death
Kramer was found dead in his Montreal apartment on 8 April 2013. Although a cause of death was not immediately confirmed, Kramer was HIV-positive and had previously had a lung removed due to a bout of lung cancer. His last play Sherlock Holmes was performed at the Segal Centre for Performing Arts in Montreal from 4 to 26 May 2013. The play, which starred Jay Baruchel in the titular role, had also cast Kramer as Inspector Lestrade. The play went ahead, with fellow cast member Patrick Costello stepping in to replace Kramer as Lestrade.

Kramer was openly gay.

Filmography

References

External links 
 

1961 births
2013 deaths
20th-century Canadian dramatists and playwrights
21st-century Canadian dramatists and playwrights
20th-century Canadian novelists
21st-century Canadian novelists
20th-century Canadian short story writers
21st-century Canadian short story writers
20th-century English dramatists and playwrights
21st-century British dramatists and playwrights
20th-century English novelists
21st-century English novelists
English emigrants to Canada
Canadian male novelists
Canadian male short story writers
Canadian male television actors
Canadian male voice actors
Canadian male stage actors
Canadian male dramatists and playwrights
English male novelists
English male short story writers
English short story writers
English male television actors
English male voice actors
English male stage actors
English male dramatists and playwrights
English theatre directors
English LGBT writers
Canadian LGBT novelists
Canadian LGBT dramatists and playwrights
Canadian gay writers
Canadian gay actors
Male actors from Hertfordshire
Writers from Hertfordshire
People with HIV/AIDS
20th-century Canadian male writers
21st-century Canadian male writers
Canadian expatriates in England
Gay dramatists and playwrights
Gay novelists
21st-century Canadian LGBT people
20th-century Canadian LGBT people